Chakki river is a tributary of river Beas River. It flows through Indian states Himachal Pradesh and Punjab and joins Beas near Pathankot. It is fed by snow and rain in the Dhauladhar mountains.

References

External links
Chakki river scripts another ‘wasteland’
117-year old bridge over Chakki river collapses 2007
Chakki river bridge washed away in Punjab due to rains in HP 2008

Rivers of Punjab, India
Rivers of Himachal Pradesh
Rivers of India